{{Infobox ancient site
| name = Atapuerca Mountains
| native_name = Sierra de Atapuerca
| alternate_name =
| image = SierraAtapuerca.jpg
| alt = Atapuerca Mountains panorama
| caption = Atapuerca Mountains panorama
| image_size = 240 px
| map_type = Spain Province of Burgos#Spain Castile and León#Spain
| map_alt = Atapuerca Mountains in Spain
| map_caption = Location in Spain
| map_size = 240 px
| relief = yes
| coordinates = 
| location = near Atapuerca, Ibeas de Juarros
| region = Burgos, Castile and León
| type =
| part_of =
| length =
| width =
| area =
| height =
| depth =
| builder =
| material =
| built =
| abandoned =
| epochs = Paleolithic
| cultures =
| dependency_of =
| occupants = Homo antecessor, Homo heidelbergensis, Homo neanderthalensis
| event =
| excavations = since 1964
| archaeologists = Francisco Jordá Cerdá
| ownership =
| management =
| public_access =
| website = http://www.atapuerca.org/
| notes = 
}}
The Atapuerca Mountains is a karstic hill formation near the village of Atapuerca  in the province of Burgos (autonomous community of Castile and Leon), northern Spain. 

In a still ongoing excavation campaign, rich fossil deposits and stone tool assemblages have been discovered which are attributed to the earliest known hominin residents in Western Europe. This "exceptional reserve of data" has been deposited during extensive Lower Paleolithic presence, as the Atapuerca Mountains served as the preferred occupation site of Homo erectus, Homo antecessor, Homo heidelbergensis and Homo neanderthalensis communities. The earliest specimen so far unearthed and reliably dated confirm an age between 1.2 million and 630,000 years. 

The Archaeological site of Atapuerca is a World Heritage Site. Some finds are exhibited in the nearby Museum of Human Evolution, in Burgos.

Regional geography

They are located at the north-east corner of the Douro basin, to the south of the Cantabrian Mountains that run across northern Spain, and stretch alongside the Bureba corridor, a mountain pass that connects the Ebro river valley with the Mediterranean Sea and the Duero basin. This conjunction constitutes an ecotone, which is rich in species of both ecosystems. The mountain pass was part of a causeway built by the Romans, as well as part of the pilgrimage route of Saint James; it is now traversed by the N-I and AP-1 highways. The mountains are strategically located between two major drainage divides and near the mountain pass; this location is assumed to have been a factor in the area's successful and prolonged hominid habitation.

Fauna
In 2008 scholars identified a new genus and species of red-toothed shrew from the Pleistocene layers of the Gran Dolina cave. Until this discovery, researchers had believed that the fossils found in this area were of the Beremendia fissidens type, but recent research has been published to support an Asiatic type called Dolinasorex glyphodon that might be endemic and is the earliest known type of soricid in the Iberian peninsula.

Archaeological site

The archaeological site was designated a UNESCO World Heritage Site in 2000.

 Recorded history 
Piedrahita ("standing stone") in the Atapuerca valley is according to records site of the Battle of Atapuerca, which took place in 1054 between the forces of Ferdinand I of Castile and his brother García V of Navarre.

 Economic and demographic development 
Apart from the typical dryland farming of the region, the municipality has grown significantly in economic, demographic and social level with the impact generated by the presence of the archaeological site and its associated services. 15% of the active population owns a job related to tourism. This "tertiarization" of their economy has reversed depopulation by growing and rejuvenating it (with the average age at 42 years).

 Gallery 

 See also 

 Devil's Tower (Gibraltar)
 Forbes' Quarry
 List of fossil sites (with link directory) List of human evolution fossils
 Orce
 Pierolapithecus''
 Sidrón Cave
 Sima de las Palomas

References

External links

 Official Web Page of the Atapuerca UCM-ISCIII Research Group 
 American Museum of Natural History-Atapuerca
 www.atapuerca.com

World Heritage Sites in Spain
Prehistoric sites in Spain
 
Neanderthal fossils
Neanderthal sites
Bien de Interés Cultural landmarks in the Province of Burgos